First-seeded Helen Jacobs defeated second-seeded Sarah Fabyan 6–2, 6–4 in the final to win the women's singles tennis title at the 1935 U.S. National Championships. The tournament was played on outdoor grass courts and held from August 29, through September 12, 1939 at the West Side Tennis Club in Forest Hills, Queens, New York.

The draw consisted of 64 players of which seven were seeded.

Seeds
The eight seeded U.S. players are listed below. Helen Jacobs is the champion; others show in brackets the round in which they were eliminated.

  Helen Jacobs (champion)
  Sarah Fabyan (finalist)
  Carolin Babcock (quarterfinals)
  Marjorie Van Ryn (quarterfinals)
  Gracyn Wheeler (third round)
  Catherine Wolf (third round)
  Dorothy Andrus (third round)

Draw

Final eight

References

1935
1935 in women's tennis
1935 in American women's sports
Women's Singles
Women's sports in New York (state)
Women in New York City
Forest Hills, Queens
1935 in New York City
1935 in sports in New York (state)